Jeanne Laverne Carmen (August 4, 1930 – December 20, 2007) was an American model, actress and trick-shot golfer.

Early life and career
Carmen was born in Paragould, Arkansas. As a child, she picked cotton before running away from home at age 13.  As a teen, she moved to New York City and landed a job as a dancer in Burlesque, with Bert Lahr. Later, she became a model, appearing as a pin-up girl in several men's magazines, including Wink, Titter, and Beauty Parade. She was a trick shot golfer, appearing with and managed by Jack Redmond. She toured country clubs and county fairs with Redmond and her then husband Sandy Scott. In her 20s, while on tour and traveling to Florida, she met Johnny Rosselli, the Chicago Outfit's liaison in Los Angeles, who drove her, without her husband, to  Las Vegas. The pair, now intimate, stayed at the Desert Inn, where they scammed rich victims who bet unsuccessfully against her winning games on the casino's golf course. Rosselli introduced her to Frank Sinatra, who took her away from Las Vegas to Hollywood.

In Hollywood she appeared in B-movies such as Guns Don't Argue and The Monster of Piedras Blancas. She played both brassy platinum-blondes and (with her natural dark hair) sultry Spanish women. Carmen's smoldering good looks, hourglass figure, and striking green eyes quickly landed her on the big screen in 1956 playing a feisty Spanish senorita named "Serelda" in the film The Three Outlaws, a Western based on the same events as the later Butch Cassidy and the Sundance Kid, and co-starring Neville Brand and Alan Hale, Jr as Butch and Sundance. She was then cast by producer/director Howard W. Koch as an Indian girl in War Drums alongside Lex Barker of Tarzan fame. Koch took a liking to Carmen and cast her in his next film for Warner Bros, the teenage rock 'n' roll juvenile delinquent themed Untamed Youth (1957), co-starring Rockabilly legend Eddie Cochran, which inspired Cochran to cover the song "Jeannie, Jeannie, Jeannie" for her.

Carmen also appeared as a femme fatale in Portland Exposé alongside Frank Gorshin who later gained fame as the "Riddler" on the Batman TV series. She also appeared in the Three Stooges short subject A Merry Mix Up playing Joe Besser's girlfriend "Mary". The short is notable for the Stooges playing three sets of identical triplets.

Later years
In 1998, Carmen was the subject of a TV biography titled "Jeanne Carmen: Queen of the B-Movies," on the series E! True Hollywood Story. The show stated that Carmen maintained a "dangerously close friendship with Marilyn Monroe and The Kennedys" and that after the death of Monroe, Carmen was told to leave town by Johnny Rosselli who was working for Chicago Mob Boss Sam Giancana. Believing her life was in danger, she fled to Scottsdale, Arizona, where she lived incognito for more than a decade. Carmen abandoned her platinum-blonde locks, had three children and lived a quiet life, never mentioning her prior life in Hollywood.

Carmen's last published interview was on November 21, 2007, by SX News, an Australian weekly gay and lesbian newspaper.

Death
On December 20, 2007, aged 77, Jeanne Carmen died from lymphoma at her home in Irvine, California, where she had resided since 1978.
Her burial crypt headstone contains the epitaph: "She Came, She Saw, She Conquered." She was survived by three children, Melinda, Kellee Jade, and Brandon, and three grandchildren.

At the time of Carmen's death, a biographical film of her life was in early stages of development, with Christina Aguilera, Scarlett Johansson, and Kate Bosworth under consideration to play Carmen.

Filmography

References

External links
 Jeannecarmen.com Official Website
 
 

Actresses from Arkansas
Female models from Arkansas
American film actresses
American television actresses
Burials at Pacific View Memorial Park
Deaths from cancer in California
Deaths from lymphoma
People from Paragould, Arkansas
People from Irvine, California
1930 births
2007 deaths
20th-century American actresses
Glamour models
21st-century American women